Polypedates hecticus is a species of frog in the family Rhacophoridae.
It is endemic to Samar, Philippines.

Its natural habitats are subtropical or tropical moist lowland forests, rivers, freshwater marshes, and intermittent freshwater marshes.

References

hecticus
Amphibians of the Philippines
Amphibians described in 1863
Taxa named by Wilhelm Peters
Taxonomy articles created by Polbot